Shihat Hama (also spelled Shiha or al-Shyha) is a village in northwestern Syria, administratively part of the Hama Governorate, located just west of Hama. Nearby localities include Qamhana to the northeast, Khitab to the north, Kafr al-Tun to the west and Tayzin to the south. According to the Syria Central Bureau of Statistics (CBS), Shihat Hama had a population of 3,985 in the 2004 census. Its inhabitants are predominantly Sunni Muslims In the 1960s, it was noted that Shihat Hama contained several domed huts. The village is administered by a municipality established in 1989. Other localities included in the municipality are Maar Daftein, al-Qadiriyah and Mazraat al-Safa.

References

Bibliography

 

Populated places in Hama District